Leist is a surname of German origin. Notable people with the surname include:

 Arthur Leist  (1852–1927), German writer
 Burkard Wilhelm Leist (1819–1906), German jurist 
 Fred Leist (1873–1945), Australian artist
 Julian Leist (born 1988), German footballer
 M. C. Leist (1942-2022), American politician
 Reiner Leist (born 1964), German-born photographer now living in the United States

References

Occupational surnames
German-language surnames